Wetton/Manzanera (also known as One World) is a 1987 album by English musicians John Wetton (Ex-King Crimson, U.K., Ex-Asia) and Phil Manzanera (Roxy Music, Quiet Sun, 801, Record producer). The two had previously performed together on tours with Roxy Music and on Manzanera's solo albums Diamond Head and K-Scope.  The album features members of two art rock/progressive rock bands, 10cc (Vic Emerson and Kevin Godley) and Yes (Alan White).

Overview and reception 
This album arose when John Wetton recorded demos at Phil Manzanera's studio. Manzanera showed Wetton music for an unfinished song, which Wetton completed. That song became "It's Just Love" – the first on this album. So good was the result that the pair agreed to record a full collection. 

Wetton had a deal with Geffen – despite the split of Asia after 1985's underperforming Astra – and was allowed by the label to record with Manzanera. The result was released by Geffen.

The album was not well received. For AllMusic, Paul Collins wrote, "With usual suspects (empty love song lyrics, overly slick production), there's an extraordinary lack of personality." Musician reviewer J. D. Considine wrote simply: "Asia Minor."

Track listing 
All tracks are written by Phil Manzanera and John Wetton

Side 1

Side 2

Personnel

Musicians 

 John Wetton - lead and backing vocals, bass, guitar, keyboards, producer
 Phil Manzanera - lead guitar, keyboards, possible backing vocals, producer

with

 Vic Emerson - orchestral keyboards 
 Alan White - drums, percussion
 Kevin Godley - backing vocals

Production 

 Keith Bessey - producer, engineer
 Richard Evans - design, art direction
 Tony McGee - photography
 Brian Lane and Steve O'Rourke - management
 Greg Fulginity - original mastering at Artisan Sound Recorders

References 

1987 albums
John Wetton albums
Phil Manzanera albums
Albums produced by Phil Manzanera
Geffen Records albums